Toini is a Finnish given name, derived from Antonia. It is also considered to be the feminine form of Finnish masculine given name Anttoni in use in Finland, eastern Sweden and the Republic of Karelia. Toini may refer to:

Toini Gustafsson (born 1938), former Swedish cross country skier
Toini Pöysti (born 1933), former cross-country skier from Finland
Toini Topelius (1854–1910), Finnish journalist

References 

Finnish feminine given names